Rudolph Edward "Rudy" Andabaker (August 1, 1928 – September 25, 2016) was a professional American football offensive guard in the National Football League (NFL).

References

External links
NFL.com profile

1928 births
2016 deaths
People from Donora, Pennsylvania
Players of American football from Pennsylvania
American football offensive guards
Pittsburgh Steelers players
Pittsburgh Panthers football players